The Lament of Edward II ("En tenps de iver me survynt damage") is traditionally credited to Edward II of England, and thought to have been written during his imprisonment shortly after he was deposed by his wife Isabella in January 1327.  Not all readers are convinced of the royal attribution of its authorship.  The poem, in fifteen stanzas, bears the heading De Le Roi Edward, le Fiz Roi Edward, Le Chanson Qe Il Fist Mesmes ("Of the King Edward, son of King Edward, the Song that He Made himself").  It was a chanson, and was likely to be sung to an existing tune. In each stanza two rhymes alternate, in approximately octosyllabic lines. The text survives in a manuscript on vellum at Longleat, bound into a volume titled Tractatus varii Theologici saec. XIII et XIV (76v and 77r), causing it to be overlooked; and in a manuscript in the Royal Library.  It was identified by Paul Studer and first published by him with a short literary introduction and an English translation in 1921.

"The tone of the poem, the line of arguments, the touches of deep personal feeling unmistakably stamp the work as genuine," Studer concluded. "The king's song is a rare and valuable specimen of Anglo-Norman lyric poetry."  The poet uses the poetical conventions of Provençal love poetry to lament his fall, the loss of his queen and his kingdom.  In the Provençal tradition of the canso, he commences by invoking the (winter) season and ends with an envoi. Nevertheless, the poem compares favourably with contemporary poems of Northern France, Studer concludes: "It is free from their mannerism and artifice, and possesses a directness of speech and an accent of deep sincerity which they seldom exhibit."

A garbled account of this "lamentable complaynt" from manuscripts that he had seen, "with many other of the same makynge" was given by Robert Fabyan (died 1513), who rendered six lines of the incipit in Latin and offered his own flowery and pedantic variant in English. No other poems by Edward survive. A translation into modern English is in Ref 6.

External links
Full text of the poem in Studer, Paul, "An Anglo-Norman Poem by Edward II, King of England", The Modern Language Review, Volume XVI, 1921.

Notes

Anglo-Norman literature
1327 works
Edward II of England